Stefan Klaverdal (born 7 March 1975 in Stockholm, Sweden) is a Swedish composer and sound artist working mainly with performative electronic, chamber and vocal music. He teaches at both Malmö Academy of Music and Malmö Art Academy. In 2004, he was accepted as a member into the Association of Swedish composers (FST).
Internationally praised in several competitions, both 2006 and 2008 he was awarded first prize in the International Competition for Electroacoustic Music in Bourges for the electronic music to the dance films Human Pattern and Insyn. 2010 the CD Revelations was released with music performed by London-based Tippett Quartet among others. In 2011 he received The Prince Eugen Culture Prize.

Selected Pieces
 Levande Vatten (Living Water) - for children's choir, mixed choir, percussion, organ and computer
 The Sacred Family - for string quartet and computer (2005–2008)
 The Longing of Eurydice - violin, piano och elektronik (2005)
 Mänskligt Mönster / Human Pattern - electroacoustic music to the film Human Pattern by Klara Elenius (2005)
 On Being - for saxophone quartet and computer (2004/2005)
 Vägen framför andra - for mixed choir (2004)
 Judas - oratory for narrator, tenor, baryton, mixed choir, organ and computer (2003/2004)
 Samtal / Conversations - electroacoustic music (2003)

Selected discography
 Revelations (various, 2010)
 Electric Tuba (Kjetil Myklebust, 2009)
 April och Tystnad (Lunds Vokalensemble, 2005)

References
 
 Biography at the Swedish Music Information Centre
 C-Y contemporary
 Fylkingen

External links
 official site: stefanklaverdal.com
 record label: c-y contemporary

1975 births
20th-century classical composers
21st-century classical composers
Living people
Musicians from Stockholm
Swedish classical composers
Swedish male classical composers
20th-century Swedish male musicians
20th-century Swedish musicians
21st-century Swedish male musicians